Rogue River is a 1951 American Western film directed by John Rawlins and starring Rory Calhoun, Peter Graves, Frank Fenton.

The film was made in Cinecolor, a cheaper alternative to Technicolor. Location shooting took place at Grants Pass in Oregon.

Cast
 Rory Calhoun as Ownie Rogers
 Peter Graves as Pete Dandridge
 Frank Fenton as Joe Dandridge
 Ralph Sanford as Max Bonner
 George Stern as H.P. Jackson
 Ellye Mravak as Judy Haven 
 Roy Engel as Ed Colby
 Jane Liddell as Eileen Reid
 Bob Rose as Carter Laney
 Stephen Roberts as Mayor Arthur Judson
 Duke York as Bowers

References

Bibliography
 Pitts, Michael R. Western Movies: A Guide to 5,105 Feature Films. McFarland, 2012.

External links
 

1951 films
1951 Western (genre) films
American Western (genre) films
Films directed by John Rawlins
Eagle-Lion Films films
Films shot in Oregon
1950s English-language films
1950s American films